Belvoir Media Group headquartered in Norwalk, Connecticut, is one of the nation's leading multi-channel publishers of consumer-interest websites, newsletters, magazines and books. It publishes more than 30 monthly titles across a wide range of interest sectors, including human health, pets, marine, aviation and organic farming. Belvoir also publishes more than 100 special health reports — thirty-thousand word white papers on topics that include Macular Degeneration and the Aging Eye, Heart Failure, and Living with Diabetes. The company owns numerous websites published in concert with its many titles, and runs the publishing operations of Harvard Medical School and Tufts University.

History
The progenitor of Belvoir Media Group was Belvoir Publications Inc. It was purchased by Belvoir Chairman Robert Englander in 1972, and consisted of a single title, Aviation Consumer. The publication was characterized by an advertising-free, subscriber-supported, high-value-content format modeled on Consumer Reports magazine that would become a Belvoir trademark. 

Practical Sailor was acquired in 1975, and Aviation Safety, also for pilots, was launched in 1980. During this period, Belvoir acquired additional titles in the aviation and marine domains—Light Plane Maintenance, IFR (which stands for “instrument flight rules”), and Boatbuilder. The company started Powerboat Reports in 1989. An audio information service, Pilot's Audio Update, and a newsletter titled IFR Refresher were acquired in 1992.

The mid-1990s witnessed an energetic effort to apply Belvoir's ads-free, consumer newsletter format to the equine world. The company started Michael Plumb's Horse Journal, purchased The Horse (from Tufts University) and started John Lyon's Perfect Horse, a training and horse-care publication with a western horsemanship focus. Later equine acquisitions included Rodeo (formerly Spin to Win) and Trailrider. Now renamed Belvoir Media Group, the company sold the equine division in 2012 to Active Interest Media.

In 2002, the company acquired AVweb.com, the nation's leading online news and information service for pilots, and, in 2003 Kitplanes for builders of full-size aircraft.

In 2020, Belvoir acquired Bottom Line Health (2022 circulation: 85,000) from Bottom Line Inc., followed in 2021 by the acquisition of Bottom Line Personal (2022 circulation: 225,000). The Bottom Line periodicals interview subject-matter experts in fields ranging from human wellness, to financial strategies, to meaningful lifestyle changes that contribute to readers' personal growth. The 2021 acquisition also included Bottom Line’s book division, and website BottomLineInc.com.

Health Media
In 1998, Belvoir Media Group purchased the health newsletter division of the Toronto Star. The acquisition came with eight monthly publications: Cleveland Clinic Heart Advisor, Cleveland Clinic Men’s Health Advisor, Mount Sinai School of Medicine (now Icahn School of Medicine) Focus on Healthy Aging, Weill-Cornell Women’s Health Advisor, Weill-Cornell Women’s Food and Fitness Advisor (now Women’s Nutrition Connection), Cornell Dogwatch, and Cornell Catwatch. Since that period the company has steadily started or acquired additional health titles including UCLA Healthy Years, Duke Medicine Health News (formerly published by the Massachusetts Medical Society, publishers of The New England Journal of Medicine), Environmental Nutrition, Cleveland Clinic Arthritis Advisor, and Mind, Mood and Memory with Massachusetts General Hospital. 

Belvoir Media Group is now regarded as one of the largest circulation health information publishers in the world, and manages health newsletters and special health reports for Harvard Health Publishing, and Tufts Media. Harvard's titles include Harvard Health Letter, Harvard Heart Letter, Harvard Women’s Health Watch, and Harvard Men’s Health Watch. Tufts Media publishes Health and Nutrition Letter with the Friedman School of Nutrition Science and Policy at Tufts University. 

Belvoir manages the website for Harvard Health Publishing. 

In 2016, they launched the health website University Health News

Pet Media
Belvoir Media Group manages a number of pet publications and websites. In 1998, as part of the Toronto Star deal, Belvoir began managing Dogwatch and Catwatch newsletters with Cornell University College of Veterinary Medicine. Also in 1998, Belvoir launched Whole Dog Journal, which features well-researched, in-depth articles about all aspects of dog care and training. 

In conjunction with Tufts Media, since 2009 Belvoir has published Your Dog and Catnip, monthly newsletters that partner with the Cummings School of Veterinary Medicine at Tufts University.

In 2017, Belvoir Media Group acquired Catster and Dogster magazines from Lumina Media LLC. These bimonthly publications were previously branded as Cat Fancy and Dog Fancy.

Titles
Health and Wellness
 Bottom Line Health
 Bottom Line Personal
 Cleveland Clinic Arthritis Advisor
 Cleveland Clinic Heart Advisor
 Cleveland Clinic Men's Health Advisor
 Duke Medicine Health News
 Environmental Nutrition
 Harvard Health Letter
 Harvard Heart Letter
 Harvard Women's Health Watch
 Harvard Men's Health Watch
 Harvard Health Publications Licensing
 Harvard Special Health Reports
 Belvoir Health Special Reports
 Massachusetts General Hospital Mind, Mood & Memory
 Mount Sinai School of Medicine Focus on Healthy Aging
 Tufts University Health and Nutrition Letter
 Weill Cornell Medical College Women's Nutrition Connection
 Weill Cornell Medical College Women's Health Advisor
 UCLA Medical Center Healthy Years
 University Health News

Aviation
 AVWeb
 Aviation Consumer
 Aviation Safety
 IFR Magazine
 IFR Refresher
 Kitplanes

Sailing
 Practical Sailor

Pets
 Whole Dog Journal
 Cornell University DogWatch
 Cornell University CatWatch
 Tufts University Catnip
 Tufts University Your Dog
 Dogster
 Catster

Home & Hobby
 MaryJanesFarm

References

External links
Company website

Mass media companies of the United States
Companies based in Norwalk, Connecticut